Looney Tunes: Unleashed is a single disc DVD featuring three Merrie Melodies cartoons. It was released on March 6, 2012. All three cartoons here have been previously released on other Warner DVD releases.

Contents

Notes

References

Looney Tunes home video releases